Zhi-Vago was a German dream trance music band, produced by Claudio Mangione and Gottfried Engels. Its most successful single was "Celebrate (The Love)", which was a top ten hit in France and Switzerland. The next singles, "Dreamer", was a moderate hit in France, while other ones, including a cover version of U2, passed almost unnoticed.

Discography

Singles

References

External links
 Zhi-Vago, on Eurohitmusic

German dance music groups
Musical groups established in 1996